Compensation and benefits (C&B) is a sub-discipline of human resources, focused on employee compensation and benefits policy-making.  While compensation and benefits are tangible, there are intangible rewards such as recognition, work-life and development. Combined, these are referred to as total rewards. The term "compensation and benefits" refers to the discipline as well as the rewards themselves.

The basic components of employee compensation and benefits

Employee compensation and benefits are divided into four basic categories:

Guaranteed pay – a fixed monetary (cash) reward paid by an employer to an employee.  The most common form of guaranteed pay is base salary. Guaranteed pay also includes cash allowances (housing allowance, transport allowance, etc.), differentials (shift differentials, holiday differentials) and premiums (night shift, etc.)
The Variable pay – a non-fixed monetary (cash) reward paid by an employer to an employee that is contingent on discretion, performance, or results achieved.  The most common forms of variable pay are bonuses and incentives.
Benefits – programs an employer uses to supplement employees’ compensation, such as paid time off, medical insurance, company car, and more.
Equity-based compensation – stock or pseudo stock programs an employer uses to provide actual or perceived ownership in the company which ties an employee's compensation to the long-term success of the company.  The most common examples are stock options.

Guaranteed pay

Guaranteed pay is a fixed monetary (cash) reward.

The basic element of guaranteed pay is base salary which is paid on an hourly, daily, weekly, bi-weekly, semi-monthly or monthly rate.  Base salary is provided for doing the job the employee is hired to do. The size of the salary is determined mainly by 1) the prevailing market salary level paid by other employers for that job, and 2) the performance of the person in the job. Many countries, provinces, states or cities dictate a minimum wage. Employees' individual skills and level of experience leave room for differentiating income levels within a job-based pay structure.

In addition to base salary, allowances may be paid to an employee for specific purposes other than performing the job. These can include allowances for transportation, housing, meals, cost of living, seniority, or as payments in lieu of medical or pension benefits. The use of allowances varies widely by country, as well as job level and the nature of job duties.

Variable pay

Variable pay is a non-fixed monetary (cash) reward that is contingent on discretion, performance, or results achieved.
There are different types of variable pay plans, such as bonus schemes, sales incentives (commission), overtime pay, and more.

An example where this type of plan is prevalent is how the real estate industry compensates real estate agents. A common variable pay plan might be the sales person receives 50% of every dollar they bring in up to a level of revenue at which they then bump up to 85% for every dollar they bring in going forward. Typically, this type of plan is based on an annual period of time requiring a "resetting" each year back to the starting point of 50%. Sometimes this type of plan is administered so the sales person never resets or falls down to a lower level.
It also includes Performance Linked Incentive which is variable and may range from 130% to 0% as per performance of the individual as per his key result areas (KRA).

Benefits

There are a wide variety of benefits offered to employees such as Paid Time-Off (PTO), various types of insurance (such as life, medical, dental, and disability), participation in a retirement plan (such as pension or 401(k)), or access to a company car, among others.  Some benefits are mandatory which are regulated by the government while others are voluntarily offered to fulfill the need of a specific employee population.  Benefit plans are typically not provided in cash but form the basis of an employees' pay package along with base salary and bonus.

In the United States, "qualified" employee benefit plans must be offered to all employees, while "non-qualified" benefit plans may be offered to a select group such as executives or other highly-paid employees.  When implementing a benefit plan, HR Departments must ensure compliance with federal and state regulations. Many states and countries dictate different minimum benefits such as minimum paid time-off, employer's pension contribution, sick pay, among others.

In the United Kingdom, salary sacrifice arrangements are used to provide non-cash benefits. An agreement is put in place to reduce an employee's entitlement to cash pay in return for the non-cash benefit. The arrangement must not reduce the employee's cash earnings below the National Minimum Wage (NMW) threshold.

Equity-based compensation

Equity-based compensation is an employer compensation plan using the employer's shares as employee compensation. The most common form is stock options, yet employers use additional vehicles such as restricted stock, restricted stock units (RSU), employee stock purchase plan (ESPP), performance shares (PSU) and stock appreciation rights (SAR). A stock option is defined as "a contract right granted to an individual to purchase a certain number of shares of stock at a certain price (and subject to certain conditions) over a defined period of time." Performance shares (PSU) awards of company stock given to managers and executives only if specified organization performance criteria are met, such as earnings per share target

Intangible benefits 

An employee may receive intangible benefits, such as a desirable work schedule.  That could be a schedule that is controlled by the employee and can be adjusted to accommodate occasional non-work activities, or one that is highly predictable, which makes it easier for the employee to arrange childcare or transportation to work.

Access to training programs, mentorship, opportunities to travel or to meet other people in the same field, and similar experiences are all intangible benefits that may appeal to some employees.

Pay aggregates 

Various combinations of the above four categories are referred to as pay aggregates. Common aggregates are explained below.

Together, guaranteed and variable pay comprise total cash compensation. The ratio of base salary to variable pay is referred to as the pay mix. For example, a person receiving a bonus equal to 25% of base salary would have an 80/20 pay mix. Organizations often set the total cash compensation for sales people at a market level, then they split the total cash compensation into the base salary component and the incentive component following a 70/30 pay mix, while other (non-sales) employees may have a 90/10 pay mix.

Total guaranteed package or fixed cost to company are aggregates that include guaranteed pay and benefits. This represents the total fixed cost of the reward package and is useful for budgeting. All forms of variable pay (annual bonus and equity compensation) are excluded from this aggregate.

Total direct pay refers to total cash compensation plus equity compensation. Benefits are excluded from this aggregate. Total direct pay includes all the elements that may be negotiated by a job candidate, especially for senior executive positions where annual and long-term incentives are more substantial.

Total compensation would include all four categories: guaranteed pay (salary and allowances), variable pay, benefits and equity compensation.

Remuneration is a term often used to refer to total cash compensation or total compensation.

As noted above, total rewards would include total compensation as well as intangible benefits such as culture, leadership, recognition, workplace flexibility, development and career opportunity.

External equity
External equity refers to the similarity of the practices of other organization of the same sector. If perceived like this, it can be said that the program is considered competitive or externally equitable. Usually, these comparisons are done in external labor markets where the wages vary. There are various factors that contribute to create these differences, for example, geographical location, education and work experience.

Internal equity
Internal equity is employees' perception of their duties, compensation, and work conditions as compared with those of other employees in similar positions in the same organization. As this comparison is always made within the company, problems with internal equity can result in conflict among employees, mistrust, low morale, anger and even the adoption of legal actions. Workers can make the evaluation of internal equity regarding two main points. On the one hand, procedural justice is the person's perceived fairness of the process (assigned tasks) and procedures used to make decisions about him/her. On the other hand, distributive justice refers to the perceived fairness in the distribution of outcomes (salaries). 
The classic objectives of equity based compensation plans are retention, attraction of new hires and aligning employees’ and shareholders’ interests with the long-term success of the company.

Organizational place

In most companies, compensation & benefits (C&B) design and administration falls under the umbrella of human-resources.

HR organizations in large companies are typically divided into three sub-divisions: HR business partners (HRBPs), HR centers of excellence, and HR shared services.  C&B is an HR center of excellence, like staffing and organizational development (OD).

Main influencers

Employee compensation and benefits main influencers can be divided into two: internal (company) and external influencers.

The most important internal influencers are the business objectives, labor unions, internal equity (the idea of compensating employees in similar jobs and similar performance in a similar way), organizational culture and organizational structure.

The most important external influencers are the state of the economy, inflation, unemployment rate, the relevant labor market, labor law, tax law, and the relevant industry habits and trends.

Bonus plans benefits
Bonus plans are variable pay plans.  They have three classic objectives:
1. Adjust labor cost to financial results – the basic idea is to create a bonus plan where the company is paying more bonuses in ‘good times’ and less (or no) bonuses in ‘bad times’.  By having bonus plan budget adjusted according to financial results, the company's labor cost is automatically reduced when the company isn't doing so well, while good company performance drives higher bonuses to employees.
2. Drive employee performance – the basic idea is that if an employee knows that his/her bonus depend on the occurrence of a specific event (or paid according to performance, or if a certain goal is achieved), then the employee will do whatever he/she can to secure this event (or improve their performance, or achieve the desired goal).  In other words, the bonus is creating an incentive to improve business performance (as defined through the bonus plan).
3. Employee retention – retention is not a primary objective of bonus plans, yet bonuses are thought to bring value with employee retention as well, for three reasons: a) a well designed bonus plan is paying more money to better performers; a competitor offering a competing job-offer to these top performers is likely to face a higher hurdle, given that these employees are already paid higher due to the bonus plan.  b) if the bonus is paid annually, employee is less inclined to leave the company before bonus payout; often the reason for leaving (e.g. dispute with the manager, competing job offer) 'goes away' by the time the bonus is paid.  the bonus plan 'buy' more time for the company to retain the employee.  c) employees paid more are more satisfied with their job (all other things being equal) thus less inclined to leave their employer.

The concept saying bonus plans can improve employee performance is based on the work of Frederic Skinner, perhaps the most influential psychologist of the 20th century.  Using the concept of Operant Conditioning, Skinner claimed that an organism (animal, human being) is shaping his/her voluntary behavior based on its extrinsic environmental consequences – i.e. reinforcement or punishment.

This concept captured the hearts of many, and indeed most bonus plans nowadays are designed based on it, yet since the late 1940s a growing body of empirical evidence has suggested that these if-then rewards do not work in a variety of settings common to the modern workplace. The failings of the bonus plan often relate to rewarding the wrong behaviour. For example, managers who keep to the status quo, fire valuable (expensive) employees, and engage in immoral business practices can achieve better short-term financial outcomes (and therefore a bonus) than a manager who is attempting to innovate his or her way to higher profits. When bonus plans are poorly thought out, they have the potential to damage employee performance and cause regulatory headaches. However, despite their failings, employees (and many employers) still view an effective bonus plan as the single greatest motivator in the workplace.

See also
 Reward management

References

Human resource management
Employment compensation